In mathematics, the compact-open topology is a topology defined on the set of continuous maps between two topological spaces. The compact-open topology is one of the commonly used topologies on function spaces, and is applied in homotopy theory and functional analysis.  It was introduced by Ralph Fox in 1945.

If the codomain of the functions under consideration has a uniform structure or a metric structure then the compact-open topology is the "topology of uniform convergence on compact sets." That is to say, a sequence of functions converges in the compact-open topology precisely when it converges uniformly on every compact subset of the domain.

Definition 

When working in the category of compactly generated spaces, it is common to modify this definition by restricting to the subbase formed from those  that are the image of a compact Hausdorff space. Of course, if  is compactly generated and Hausdorff, this definition coincides with the previous one. However, the modified definition is crucial if one wants the convenient category of compactly generated weak Hausdorff spaces to be Cartesian closed, among other useful properties. The confusion between this definition and the one above is caused by differing usage of the word compact.

If  is locally compact, then  from the category of topological spaces always has a right adjoint . This adjoint coincides with the compact-open topology and may be used to uniquely define it. The modification of the definition for compactly generated spaces may be viewed as taking the adjoint of the product in the category of compactly generated spaces instead of the category of topological spaces, which ensures that the right adjoint always exists.

Properties 
 If  is a metric space (or more generally, a uniform space), then the compact-open topology is equal to the topology of compact convergence.
This can be seen as a special case of the above where  is a one-point space.

Applications 
The compact open topology can be used to topologize the following sets:

 ,
 .

In addition, there is a homotopy equivalence between the spaces . These topological spaces,   are useful in homotopy theory because it can be used to form a topological space and a model for the homotopy type of the set of homotopy classes of maps

where  is the homotopy equivalence.

Fréchet differentiable functions 
The compact-open topology is the initial topology induced by the seminorms

where , for each compact subset .

See also 

 Topology of uniform convergence

References 

 
 O.Ya. Viro, O.A. Ivanov, V.M. Kharlamov and N.Yu. Netsvetaev (2007) Textbook in Problems on Elementary Topology.
 
  Topology and Groupoids Section 5.9  Ronald Brown, 2006

General topology
Topology of function spaces